The Sands of Life is an audio drama based on the long-running British science fiction television series Doctor Who. This audio drama was produced by Big Finish Productions.

Plot summary 
Sheridan Moorkurk has just been elected president of Earth... but the harsh realities of who really runs the planet are just beginning to dawn on her. And what's more, she's starting to hear voices. Meanwhile, the Doctor and Romana encounter a mass of aliens heading to Earth... Aliens who have already made the mistake of upsetting the infamous Cuthbert, all-powerful CEO of The Conglomerate, by destroying one of his space platforms. Will the Doctor and Romana be able to avert inter-species war that will destroy all life on Earth?

Cast 
 The Doctor – Tom Baker
 Romana I – Mary Tamm
 K-9 – John Leeson
 President Sheridan Moorkurk – Hayley Atwell
 Cuthbert – David Warner
 Mr Dorrick – Toby Hadoke
 The Laan – Jane Slavin
 General Vincent – Duncan Wisbey

Continuity

Notes 
 This is the second of seven releases reuniting Tom Baker and Mary Tamm as the Fourth Doctor and First Romana. Tamm died in July 2012, but completed all seven productions before her death.
 The character of Cuthbert was previously created by Nick Briggs for the AudioVisuals Doctor Who audio plays in the 1980s and 1990s.
 Cuthbert and Mr. Dorrick return in War Against the Laan, The Dalek Contract and The Final Phase.

References

External links 
 The Sands of Life

Fourth Doctor audio plays
Audio plays by Nicholas Briggs